Bhaktapur District (Nepal Bhasa : ख्वप देश (जिल्ला) located in the eastern part of Kathmandu valley, is the smallest district among the seventy-seven districts of Nepal. It is part of Bagmati Province.

Education

The average literacy rate of Bhaktapur is 81.68, where male – 90.48 and female – 72.65 which is growing with the educational awareness among peoples.

The governmental schools in Bhaktapur are making remarkable improvement in its educational quality. The government schools have been starting to facilitate students by teaching in both English and Nepali medium. Private schools too, such as CVM Secondary School, are well known for providing quality education.

Despite topping other districts in SLC with highest enrolments, the higher studies of the Bhaktapur is not quite satisfactory. There is not enough college in Bhaktapuriya rendering qualitative services. That's why, students of Bhaktapur complete their higher studies in colleges of Kathmandu and Lalitpur. However, their academic performance in those college cannot be neglected. Khwopa College situated in Dekocha Bhaktapur is one of topmost college in Nepal. The academic results of this college is outstanding. This college is established and managed by Bhaktapur municipality. One of the schools in Bhaktapur genuine secondary school is also good in its techniques of teaching. It was established by municipality.

Health care

Bhaktapur is growing aggressively on the health care services and facilities. Bhaktapur did not have enough hospitals and health care centers in the past, but now there are many public and private hospitals which provide quality medical service.

Bhaktapur district has two comprehensive cancer hospitals Bhaktapur Cancer Hospital,  and Kathmandu Cancer Center. Other major centers like National Tuberculosis Centre, Human Organ Transplant Center and Ayurvedic Centre is located in Bhaktapur. Other major hospitals are Khwopa Hospital, Bhaktapur Hospital, Siddhi Memorial Hospital (For Women & Children), Iwamura Memorial Hospital, Madhyapur Hospital, Nagarik Community Hospital, Nepal Korea friendship hospital. Recently, the Government of Nepal has decided to transfer Bir hospital, the oldest hospital in Nepal, to Duwakot, Bhaktapur.

Geography and climate

Demographics
At the time of the 2011 Nepal census, Bhaktapur District had a population of 304,651. Of these, 45.9% spoke Nepali, 42.3% Newar, 7.9% Tamang, 1.1% Maithili, 0.5% Magar, 0.4% Bhojpuri, 0.4% Rai, 0.2% Hindi, 0.2% Limbu, 0.2% Tharu, 0.1% Chamling, 0.1% Doteli, 0.1% Gurung, 0.1% Sherpa, 0.1% Sunuwar, 0.1% Urdu and 0.2% other languages as their first language.

In terms of ethnicity/caste, 46.3% were Newar, 19.6% Chhetri, 14.2% Hill Brahmin, 9.0% Tamang, 2.2% Magar, 1.1% Rai, 1.0% Sanyasi/Dasnami, 0.6% Kami, 0.5% Damai/Dholi, 0.5% Gurung, 0.5% Musalman, 0.5% Sarki, 0.5% Tharu, 0.4% other Dalit, 0.4% Limbu, 0.4% Thakuri, 0.3% Gharti/Bhujel, 0.2% Majhi, 0.2% other Terai, 0.2% Yadav, 0.1% Badi, 0.1% Terai Brahmin, 0.1% Hajam/Thakur, 0.1% Koiri/Kushwaha, 0.1% Sherpa, 0.1% Sudhi, 0.1% Teli and 0.2% others.

In terms of religion, 87.9% were Hindu, 9.2% Buddhist, 2.0% Christian, 0.5% Muslim, 0.4% Kirati and 0.1% others.

In terms of literacy, 81.3% could read and write, 1.8% could only read and 16.9% could neither read nor write.

Municipalities
The district is divided into four municipalities:
Bhaktapur
Changunarayan
Madhyapur Thimi
Suryabinayak Municipality

Places of interest
Bhaktapur Durbar Square
Taumadhi
Nagarkot
Changu Narayan
Siddha Pokhari
Kailashnath Mahadev Statue
Doleshwor Mahadev
Pilot Baba Ashram
Anantalingeshwor Mahadev
Bode

Gallery

See also
Zones of Nepal
Patan Durbar Square
Kathmandu Durbar Square

References

External links
Tourism, Travel, & Information Guide to the Royal City of Bhaktapur in Nepal.

 
Districts of Nepal established in 1962
Districts of Bagmati Province